Chryseobacterium frigidum  is a Gram-negative, aerobic and non-motile bacteria from the genus of Chryseobacterium which has been isolated from high Arctic tundra soil near Ny-Ålesund in Norway.

References

External links 

Type strain of Chryseobacterium frigidum at BacDive -  the Bacterial Diversity Metadatabase

frigidum
Bacteria described in 2016